Lo Fi Hi Fives... A Kind of Best Of... is a 2012 compilation by American multi-instrumentalist R. Stevie Moore. It was released in the UK on the O Genesis label.

The songs on this album are taken from 37 years of material. The album was compiled by R. Stevie along with Tim Burgess on Tim's label O Genesis Recordings - O Genesis already released a split single of him and the Vaccines and soon released a single of "Pop Music". The album features cameos by Irwin Chusid, Ariel Pink, Terry Burrows, Lane Steinberg, and friends/fellow Ethos bandmates Billy Anderson and Roger Ferguson.

Track listing
Track sources are provided by Moore.

References

External links

R. Stevie Moore albums
2012 compilation albums